The Beth Haim of Ouderkerk aan de Amstel is the oldest Jewish cemetery in the Netherlands. It was purchased for use as a burying ground by the Jewish community of Amsterdam in 1614 and is located in the village of Ouderkerk aan de Amstel, in the countryside near Amsterdam.

In addition to its age, the graveyard is interesting because the tombstones have inscriptions in three languages, Portuguese, Dutch and Hebrew, and because, unusually for a Jewish cemetery, many of the tombstones are carved with elaborate scenes including human figures.

There are two paintings  by Jacob van Ruisdael that were inspired by Beth Haim. Although the paintings are usually called in English "The Jewish Cemetery at Ouderkerk", the artist felt free to add picturesque elements, and they therefore do not closely resemble the actual location.

People
Famous people buried at the Beth Haim include:
 Samuel Pallache  (ca. 1550–1616), Moroccan diplomat
 Joseph Pallache (c. 1580 – 1638/1648/1657) merchant and diplomat
 numerous Pallache family (later as "Palache") descendants of brothers Samuel and Joseph Pallache
 Menasseh Ben Israel (1604–1657), rabbi and friend of Rembrandt van Rijn
 Joseph Pardo (ca. 1561–1619), Italian rabbi
 David Pardo (ca. 1591–1657), Dutch rabbi and son of Joseph Pardo
 Eliahu Montalto (1604–1657), personal physician to Maria de Medici
 Joseph Pardo (ca. 1624–1677), English hazzan
 Baruch Spinoza's parents (16th–17th centuries)
 Maup Caransa (1916-2009), real estate developer

The cemetery is open to visitors and is free of charge.

References

External links

 Beth Haim Portuguese-Jewish Cemetery, The Netherlands (official website)
 Burial lookup for the Gemeente Amsterdam Portuguese Israelite Congregation burials database

Jewish cemeteries in the Netherlands
Cemeteries in the Netherlands
Cemeteries in North Holland
Ouder-Amstel
Sephardi Jewish culture in the Netherlands